Jamarcus Jermaine "J. J." Nelson (born April 24, 1992) is an American football wide receiver who is a free agent. He played college football for the University of Alabama at Birmingham and was drafted by the Arizona Cardinals in the fifth round of the 2015 NFL Draft. He has also played for the Oakland Raiders and San Francisco 49ers.

Early years
Nelson attended Midfield High School in Birmingham, Alabama, where he led them to the state Class 4A quarterfinals after finishing 11-2 during the regular season in 2009, recording 55 catches, 1,049 yards, 214 yards rushing, five interceptions, and 19 touchdowns. He was named The Birmingham News Metro-West Player of the Year. He was listed as the No. 27 state prospect on Birmingham News Super Seniors list and was selected to The Birmingham News All-Metro West Offensive Team. He was also named to the ASWA First-team All-State.

As a track & field star, Nelson was a two-time Class 4A state champion in the 100-meter dash (best of 10.49 seconds). He also captured the 200-meter dash title with a time of 21.76 seconds. In addition, he was a highly regarded basketball player for Midfield, earning team MVP and All-region honors. He was a two-year letterwinner in both track and basketball.

College career
Nelson was named a member of the 2014 College Football All-America Team by the Walter Camp Foundation, USA Today, and CBS Sports as a kick returner. Nelson was also Conference USA special teams player of the year and first-team All-conference as a wide receiver.

Professional career
At the 2015 NFL Scouting Combine, Nelson had the fastest 40-yard dash with a time of 4.28 seconds, .04 seconds shy of the then-combine record of 4.24 seconds held then by Chris Johnson.

Nelson was drafted by the Arizona Cardinals in the fifth round, 159th overall, of the 2015 NFL Draft. In a 2015 game against the Cincinnati Bengals, Nelson scored his first career touchdown with a pass from quarterback Carson Palmer. He finished his rookie year with 11 receptions for 299 yards and two touchdowns. In 2016, Nelson played in 15 games with six starts, recording 34 catches for 568 yards and six touchdowns. He also had four rushing attempts for 83 yards and a touchdown including a run for 56 yards for the touchdown in Week 14. In Week 2 of the 2017 season, Nelson recorded five receptions for 120 yards, including a 45-yard touchdown catch in Arizona's 16–13 overtime win over the Indianapolis Colts. Nelson finished as the Week 2 yardage leader among all eligible receivers and won NFC Offensive Player of the Week. In 2018, Nelson had a career-low seven receptions for 64 yards and no touchdowns on the season.

Oakland Raiders
On March 15, 2019, Nelson signed with the Oakland Raiders. In week 3 against the Minnesota Vikings, Nelson caught 4 passes for 36 yards and his first receiving touchdown of the season as the Raiders lost 34-14.  He was released on October 10, 2019.

San Francisco 49ers 
Nelson was signed by the San Francisco 49ers on August 15, 2020. He was placed on injured reserve on August 30, 2020, with a knee injury. He was released with an injury settlement on September 6, 2020.

Buffalo Bills
On January 1, 2021, Nelson signed with the practice squad of the Buffalo Bills, and was released three days later.

Indianapolis Colts 
On February 1, 2021, Nelson signed a reserve/future contract with the Indianapolis Colts. He was placed on injured reserve on August 6, 2021. He was released on November 1.

References

External links
UAB Blazers Bio

1992 births
Living people
American football wide receivers
American football return specialists
Players of American football from Alabama
People from Jefferson County, Alabama
UAB Blazers football players
All-American college football players
Arizona Cardinals players
Oakland Raiders players
San Francisco 49ers players
Buffalo Bills players
Indianapolis Colts players